Yukon Blonde is a Canadian indie rock band originally from Kelowna, British Columbia. The band has been based in Vancouver since 2009.

Yukon Blonde's debut EP was Everything in Everyway. Their debut self-titled album, which was recorded live-to-tape, came out in 2010. For both, they worked with record producer Shawn Cole, who has previously worked with such bands as Bend Sinister and You Say Party! We Say Die!. The band has toured the US and Canada, and played at such festivals as South by Southwest. The band was named one of the "10 Canadian bands destined to break in 2010" by the CBC, and Chart called the band the best of the 2010 Canadian Music Week festival.

The album Tiger Talk was released in 2012. The band was nominated for the Juno Award for Breakthrough Group of the Year in 2013.

On March 17, 2015 the band released the first taste of new material with the single "Saturday Night" which premiered through Paste Magazine.

In October 2015, the band collaborated with Hey Rosetta! on the non-album single "Land You Love", a protest song about the 2015 federal election.

Members 
 Jeff Innes – vocals, guitar, chief songwriter
 Brandon Scott – guitar, vocals
 Graham Jones – drums, vocals
 James Younger – bass, vocals
 Rebecca Gray – Keyboard, synth, vocals
Former members
 Adam Bear – bass
 John Jeffrey – bass

Discography

Albums
 As Alphababy
 2006: You Gentle Crustacean (EP)
 2008: Alphababy Live (EP)

 As Yukon Blonde
 Everything in Everyway (EP) - October 5, 2009
 Yukon Blonde - February 9, 2010
 Fire//Water (EP) - September 20, 2011
 Tiger Talk - March 20, 2012,  No. 82 CAN
 On Blonde - June 16, 2015
 Critical Hit - June 22, 2018
 Vindicator - November 13, 2020

Singles

References

External links
 Yukon Blonde
 Yukon Blonde on CBC Radio 3
 Yukon Blonde on Nevado Records

Canadian indie rock groups
Musical groups established in 2005
Musical groups from Kelowna
Musical groups from Vancouver
2005 establishments in British Columbia